The Futtsu Power Station (富津火力発電所) is the fourth largest gas-fired power station in the world, located in Futtsu, Japan. 
All four units run on natural gas. The facility is owned by Tepco.

See also 

 List of largest power stations in the world
 List of natural gas power stations
 List of power stations in Japan

References 

Natural gas-fired power stations in Japan
Tokyo Electric Power Company
Buildings and structures in Chiba Prefecture
Futtsu